This is a list of properties and historic districts in Middletown, Connecticut that are listed on the National Register of Historic Places. There are 35 in the city, which is a large portion of all NRHP listings in Middlesex County. There are 89 others in the county, listed here.

The Middletown listings are:

Current listings

|}

See also 
 National Register of Historic Places listings in Middlesex County, Connecticut

References

 Middletown
Historic sites
Tourist attractions in Middlesex County, Connecticut